Rufus Colfax Phillips III (born August 10, 1929—died December 29, 2021) was an American writer, businessman, politician, and Central Intelligence Agency employee.

Life
Phillips was born in Middletown, Ohio and was raised in rural Charlotte County, Virginia. He attendee Woodberry Forest School and then Yale College from 1947 to 1951. He was a Central Intelligence Agency officer in Saigon in the 1950s.

In 1954, Phillips joined the United States Army and became an officer. He served as a military advisor to the South Vietnam government. Phillips was a protégé of General Edward Lansdale and participated in the 1962 RAND Counterinsurgency Symposium alongside other counterinsurgency experts such as David Galula and Frank Kitson. In Vietnam, Phillips was one af the architects of the Chieu Hoi program to persuade Vietcong fighters to defect. Phillips then lived in Fairfax County, Virginia and was president of the Inter-Continental Consultants, Inc. He served on the Fairfax County Board of Supervisors and was a Democrat. He ran for the United States House of Representatives in 1974, and lost the primary election.

Phillips is the author of Why Vietnam Matters: An Eyewitness Account of Lessons Not Learned. He is a regular guest on The John Batchelor Show and discusses topics on the wars in Iraq and Afghanistan.

Krulak Mendenhall mission

Works
Why Vietnam Matters: An Eyewitness Account of Lessons Not Learned Naval Institute Press, 2017. ,

References

External links
 Interview with Rufus C. Phillips, III
 Meeting Lt. Col. David Galula - April 1962
 Why Vietnam Matters
 Webcast Interview at the Pritzker Military Museum & Library on November 22, 2008
 

1929 births
Living people
People from Middletown, Ohio
People from Charlotte County, Virginia
People from Fairfax County, Virginia
Military personnel from Ohio
CIA personnel of the Vietnam War
Yale College alumni
Businesspeople from Virginia
United States Army officers
People of the Central Intelligence Agency
Virginia Democrats
Members of the Fairfax County Board of Supervisors
Writers from Ohio
Writers from Virginia
American male writers